George Shepherd is an English former professional rugby league footballer who played in the 1960s.

Background
George Shepherd was born in Crofton, West Riding of Yorkshire, England.

Playing career

Championship final appearances
George Shepherd played  in Wakefield Trinity's 17–10 victory over Hull Kingston Rovers in the Championship Final during the 1967–68 season at Headingley, Leeds on Saturday 4 May 1968.

Challenge Cup Final appearances
George Shepherd played  in Wakefield Trinity's 10–11 defeat by Leeds in the 1968 Challenge Cup "Watersplash" Final during the 1967–68 season at Wembley Stadium, London on Saturday 11 May 1968, in front of a crowd of 87,100.

County Cup Final appearances
George Shepherd played  in Wakefield Trinity's 18–2 victory over Leeds in the 1964 Yorkshire County Cup Final during the 1964–65 season at Fartown Ground, Huddersfield on Saturday 31 October 1964.

References

External links
Search for "Shepherd" at rugbyleagueproject.org
Rugby Cup Final 1968

Living people
English rugby league players
Place of birth missing (living people)
Rugby league hookers
Rugby league players from Wakefield
Wakefield Trinity players
Year of birth missing (living people)